Marlins are fish from the family Istiophoridae, which includes about 10 species. A marlin has an elongated body, a spear-like snout or bill, and a long, rigid dorsal fin which extends forward to form a crest. Its common name is thought to derive from its resemblance to a sailor's marlinspike. Marlins are among the fastest marine swimmers. However, greatly exaggerated speeds are often claimed in popular literature, based on unreliable or outdated reports.

They are popular sporting fish in tropical areas. The Atlantic blue marlin and the white marlin are endangered owing to overfishing.

Classification
The marlins are Istiophoriform fish, most closely related to the swordfish, which is the sole member of Xiphiidae. The carangiformes is believed to be the second-closest clade to the Marlins. Although previously thought to be closely related to Scombridae, genetic analysis only shows a slight relationship.

Genera

Timeline of genera

In literature

In the Nobel Prize-winning author Ernest Hemingway's 1952 novel The Old Man and the Sea, the central character of the work is an aged Cuban fisherman who, after 84 days without success on the water, heads out to sea to break his run of bad luck. On the 85th day, Santiago, the old fisherman, hooks a resolute marlin; what follows is a great struggle between man, sea creature, and the elements.

Frederick Forsyth's story "The Emperor", in the collection No Comebacks, tells of a bank manager named Murgatroyd, who catches a marlin and is acknowledged by the islanders of Mauritius as a master fisherman.

A marlin features prominently in the last chapter and climactic scenes of Christina Stead's The Man Who Loved Children.  Sam's friend Saul gives Sam a marlin, and Sam makes his children help him render the fish's fat.

See also

 Marlin fishing
 Sailfish

References

Further reading

External links 

 "'Ghost Fish' Revelation May Alter Marlin's Status" from National Public Radio
 Marlin Fishing from FishingBooker

Hawaiian cuisine
 
Sport fish
Taxa named by Constantine Samuel Rafinesque